A Streetcar Named Desire is a 1947 play by Tennessee Williams.

A Streetcar Named Desire may also refer to:

Media based on the play:
 A Streetcar Named Desire (1951 film), directed by Elia Kazan, starring Marlon Brando and Vivien Leigh
 A Streetcar Named Desire (1984 film), starring Ann-Margret and Treat Williams
 A Streetcar Named Desire (1995 film), starring Alec Baldwin and Jessica Lange
 A Streetcar Named Desire (opera), a 1995 opera adaptation by André Previn
 A Streetcar Named Desire (ballet), ballet productions based on the play

See also
 A Streetcar Named Marge, an episode of The Simpsons
 Desire Street, an explanation of the play's title